103rd Division or 103rd Infantry Division may refer to:

 103rd Division (1st Formation)(People's Republic of China), 1948–1951
 103rd Division (2nd Formation)(People's Republic of China), 1951–1952
 103rd Infantry Division (German Empire)
 103rd Infantry Division Piacenza, a unit of the Italian Army during World War II
 103rd Division (Imperial Japanese Army)

 103rd Infantry Division (United States)

See also
 103rd Regiment (disambiguation)